The women's pole vault event at the 2008 African Championships in Athletics was held at the Addis Ababa Stadium on May 1.

Results

References
Results (Archived)
Results

2008 African Championships in Athletics
Pole vault at the African Championships in Athletics
2008 in women's athletics